State leaders in the 15th century BC – State leaders in the 13th century BC – State leaders by year

This is a list of state leaders in the 14th century BC (1400–1301 BC).

Africa: Northeast

Egypt: New Kingdom

Eighteenth Dynasty of the New Kingdom (complete list) –
Amenhotep II, King (1425–1398 BC)
Thutmose IV, King (1398–1388 BC)
Amenhotep III, King (1388–1350 BC)
Akhenaten, King (1351–1334 BC)
Smenkhkare, King (1335–1334 BC)
Neferneferuaten, Queen (1334–1332 BC)
Tutankhamun, King (1332–1323 BC)
Ay, King (1323–1319 BC)
Horemheb, King (1319–1292 BC)

Asia

Asia: East

China

Shang, China (complete list) –
Zu Xin, King (c.1405–1389 BC)
Wo Jia, King (c.1389–1364 BC)
Zu Ding, King (c.1364–1332 BC)
Nan Geng, King (c.1332–1303 BC)
Yang Jia, King (c.1303–1290 BC)

Asia: Southeast
Vietnam
Hồng Bàng dynasty (complete list) –
Đoài line, (c.1431–c.1332 BC)
Giáp line, (c.1331–c.1252 BC)

Asia: West

Hittite: New Kingdom, List –
Tudhaliya I, King ( 000 )
Arnuwanda I, King ( 000 )
Hattusili II, King ( 000 )
Tudhaliya II, King (c.1360?–1344 BC, short chronology)
Tudhaliya III, King assassinated upon his father's death, unknown if he actually ruled
Suppiluliuma I, King (c.1344–1322 BC, short chronology)
Arnuwanda II, King (c.1322–1321 BC, short chronology)
Mursili II, King (c.1321–1295 BC, short chronology)

Mitanni, List –
Kirta, King (c.1500 BC, short chronology)
Artatama I, Ruler ( 000 ), contemporary of Pharaohs Thutmose IV and Amenhotep II
Shuttarna II, Ruler ( 000 )
Artashumara, Ruler ( 000 )
Tushratta, Ruler (c.1350 BC, short chronology), contemporary of Hittite Suppiluliuma I and Pharaohs Amenhotep III & IV
Artatama II, Ruler ( 000 ). ruled same time as Tushratta
Shuttarna III, Ruler ( 000 ). contemporary of Suppiluliuma I of the Hittites

Ugarit
Ammittamru I, King (c.1350 BC)
Niqmaddu II, King (c.1349–1315 BC) contemporary of Suppiluliuma I of the Hittites
Arhalba, King (c.1315–1313 BC)
Niqmepa, King (c.1313–1260 BC) Treaty with Mursili II of the Hittites, Son of Niqmadu II,

Tyre, Phoenecia –
Agenor, King (c.1500 BC)
Phoenix, King ( 000 )

Assyria
 Old Assyrian Period
Ashur-bel-nisheshu, King (c.1407–1399 BC, short chronology)
Ashur-rim-nisheshu, King (c.1398–1391 BC, short chronology)
Ashur-nadin-ahhe II, King (c.1390–1381 BC, short chronology)

Assyria
 Middle Assyrian Period
Eriba-Adad I, King (c.1380–1353 BC, short chronology)
Ashur-uballit I, King (c.1353–1318 BC, short chronology)
Enlil-nirari, King (c.1317–1308 BC, short chronology)
Arik-den-ili, King (c.1307–1296 BC, short chronology)

Kassite Dynasty, Third Dynasty of Babylon —
Agum III, King ( 000 )
Karaindash contemporary of Amenophis III of Egypt
Kadashman-harbe I, King ( 000 )
Kurigalzu I, King ( 000 )
Kadashman-Enlil I, King (c.1374–1360 BC), contemporary of Amenophis III
Burnaburiash II, King (c.1359–1333 BC), contemporary of Akhenaten and Ashur-uballit I
Kara-hardash, King (c.1333 BC)
Nazi-Bugash or Shuzigash, King (c.1333 BC)
Kurigalzu II, King (c.1332–1308 BC), fought Battle of Sugagi with Enlil-nirari of Assyria
Nazi-Maruttash, King (c.1307–1282 BC), contemporary of Adad-nirari I of Assyria

Elam (complete list) –
Kidinuid dynasty
Shalla, King (?)
Temti-Ahar, King (c.1370 BC–?)
Igehalkid dynasty
Ata-Halki, King (?)
Attar-Kittah I, King (?)
Ige-Halki, King (?)
Pahir-Ishshan I, King (c.1390 BC–?)
Kidin-Hutran I, King (?)
Attar-Kittah II, King (?)
Humban-Numena I, King (c.1370 BC–?)
Untash-Napirisha or Untash-Humban, King (c.1340 BC–?)
Kidin-Hutran II, King (?)

References 

State Leaders
-
14th-century BC rulers